2–2A High Petergate is an historic building in the English city of York, North Yorkshire. A Grade II listed building, it stands adjacent to (and partially built into) Bootham Bar at the opposite end of High Petergate from York Minster. It was built around 1840; a shopfront was added the following century.

As of 2023, the building, and the adjacent number 4 High Petergate, is occupied by the twelve-bedroom inn The Fat Badger, which opened in May 2022. The inn's bar and some of its guest rooms occupy the ground floor and first floor, respectively, of 2 and 2A. The Fat Badger succeeded another inn, the Lamb & Lion.

Composition 
Per Historic England, the building is constructed of orange-grey brick in Flemish bond on the front of the building and in English garden-wall bond at the rear.

The building has a two-storey, two-window façade. The shopfront, which is made of timber, is framed in sunken-panel pilasters below a sunken-panel fascia. It has a moulded cornice, with scrolled foliate consoles. The four-light shop window sits above a raised panel riser and, to the right, a pair of sunken-panel doors. Except for the doors, which have a blocked overlight, this section curves outward to meet the adjacent number 4 High Petergate. Another door, on the left of the shopfront window, is four-panelled with an overlight.

The windows of the first floor are twelve-pane sashes.

The interior has not been inspected.

References 

Petergate
Grade II listed buildings in York
Grade II listed houses
19th-century establishments in England
19th century in York